The Wonka Bar is a fictional chocolate bar, introduced as a key story point in the 1964 novel Charlie and the Chocolate Factory by Roald Dahl. Wonka Bars appear in both film adaptations of the novel, Willy Wonka & the Chocolate Factory (1971) and Charlie and the Chocolate Factory (2005), and the play, Charlie and the Chocolate Factory the Musical (2013) each with different packaging.

Wonka bars were created by Quaker Oats (in conjunction with the producers of Willy Wonka and the Chocolate Factory). The movie was funded largely by Quaker Oats for the intention of promoting the soon to be released Wonka Bars. Quaker Oats had a problem with the formulation of the bars and Wonka Bars had to be pulled from store shelves.

Other varieties of Wonka Bars were subsequently manufactured and sold in the real world, formerly by the Willy Wonka Candy Company, a division of Nestlé. These bars were discontinued in January 2010 due to poor sales.

In media
In Roald Dahl's novel Charlie and the Chocolate Factory and its film adaptations, a Wonka Bar is a chocolate bar and Willy Wonka’s signature product, said to be the "perfect candy bar". The wrappers of the 1971 version are brown with an orange and pink border with a top hat over the "W" in Wonka, similar to the film's logo, and the chocolate bars resemble Cadbury Dairy Milk chocolate bars. In the 2005 version, the wrappers feature different shades of a color (depending on the type of chocolate bar) and are also more detailed, including a more stylised "W" without a top hat, and the chocolate bars strikingly resemble king-sized Kit Kat chocolate bars, only slightly bigger. In the book, Grandpa Joe mentions that Mr. Wonka had invented over two hundred kinds of Wonka bars (though the actual number available varies, with four flavours in the 2005 film).

Product

The consumer product Wonka Bar was a chocolate bar inspired by the novel and the films Willy Wonka & the Chocolate Factory and Charlie and the Chocolate Factory.

The Quaker Oats Company, which financed the 1971 film with US$3 million, originally created a chocolate bar in time to publicize the 1971 film. In the documentary Pure Imagination, producer David L. Wolper claims the bar was released to stores, but quickly recalled due to a production problem.

Nestlé Wonka Bars
Manufactured by Nestlé and sold under their Willy Wonka Candy Company brand, Wonka Bars sold in the United States until January 2010.  Wonka Bars consisted of small graham cracker pieces dipped in milk chocolate. The brand was launched by Chicago's Breaker Confections in 1976, and purchased by Nestle in 1988.

Other bars produced included Wonka Xploder, Wonkalate and Wonka Biscuits.

To promote the Charlie and the Chocolate Factory film, 5 Wonka products (including a Wonka bar) were packaged with a Golden Ticket, as in the novel and films. The Golden Ticket in a Wonka Bar entitled the winner to a $10000 cash prize.

A Nestlé factory in Europe began producing Wonka Bars in the flavors and wrappers depicted in the 2005 film: Whipple-Scrumptious Fudgemallow Delight, Nutty Crunch Surprise [without actual nuts] and Triple Dazzle Caramel.

Nestlé Japan also released some Wonka Bars, in two flavours, Whipple Scrumptious Caramel Delight and Mysterious Spit-Spat Bar. These bars feature a wrapper done in the same style as the bars that appear in the Tim Burton film adaptation. More flavors appeared, including Piritto Natty Bur, Edible Garden, Eureka Moment, Happy Go Lucky, and Making WoW! Nestlé Japan also released a toy truck containing these bars. However, they have since been discontinued after the sale to Ferrero.

In March 2010, Nestlé USA introduced a new line of chocolate bars named "Wonka Exceptionals", consisting of three varieties. The Wonka Scrumdiddlyumptious Chocolate Bar (based on a bar of the same name from the 1971 film) consists of bits of toffee, cookie and peanuts in milk chocolate. The Wonka Chocolate Waterfall Bar contains white chocolate swirled with milk chocolate (named in reference to and emulating the chocolate waterfall and its purpose of churning the chocolate river), and the Wonka Domed Dark Chocolate Bar is made of dark chocolate topped with milk chocolate medallions. Wonka launched the product line with an in-package Golden Ticket sweepstakes. Ten Golden Tickets could be found in bars and bags of Wonka Exceptionals chocolates, and each ticket was worth a grand prize of a trip around the world. Recent new additions to the Wonka Exceptionals include Wonka Triple Dazzle Caramel, which consists of milk chocolate filled with caramel and a dash of sea salt (this variety had previously been produced to promote the 2005 film, where it consisted of caramel in white chocolate as opposed to milk), and Wonka Fantabulous Fudge, which consists of chocolate fudge in milk chocolate. They were discontinued in 2012.

On 9 August 2013, Nestle UK announced that the Wonka Bar was to return to the UK, after having not been sold since 2005. The new Wonka Bars are available in small individual bars and 100g big block bars. There are currently three flavours, Millionaire's Shortbread, Crème Brûlée and Chocolate Nice Cream. Crème Brûlée is not available in small bars and is only available in big block bars. The small individual bars went on sale on 16 September 2013 and the big block bars went on sale in October that year. They never sold in the United States, and were discontinued in 2014 due to falling sales.

In late 2013, Nestlé Australia and New Zealand introduced new additions to the Wonka Bar Line, 170g Big Blocks Bars which were released in four flavours, Wonka Triple Chocolate Whipple Bar, Nutty Crunchilicious, Caramel Hat Trick and Chocolate Tales Bar. More additions included Cookie Creamery, and Mudpuff Caramel Stuff, also released in smaller sizes. These also got discontinued later.

Fake bars 
In the UK there is an ongoing trend of fake Wonka bars being sold. In 2013, a shop in Manchester was fined for selling fake Wonka bars with a fake 'golden ticket' prize. Other cases of the fake bars were reported across the UK.

In 2022, the Food Standards Agency issued a warning that fake Wonka bars were being sold in the UK with incorrect allergy advice. Bars were found to contain allergens such as nuts, which were not listed on the label.  A shop in Barnsley was fined for selling fake bars. Westminster City Council seized over £100,000 in fake Wonka bars from shops on Oxford Street.

See also
 Everlasting Gobstopper

References

External links
 

Fictional food and drink
The Willy Wonka Candy Company brands
Products introduced in 1971
Brand name confectionery
Chocolate bars
Charlie and the Chocolate Factory